Allium azutavicum is a rare plant species endemic to Kazakhstan.

References

azutavicum
Onions
Flora of Kazakhstan
Plants described in 2003